Niphosaperda rondoni is a species of beetle in the family Cerambycidae, and the only species in the genus Niphosaperda. It was described by Breuning in 1962.

References

Apomecynini
Beetles described in 1962
Monotypic beetle genera